CPPC may refer to:

Organisations
 Colección Patricia Phelps de Cisneros, a privately held Latin American art organization based in Venezuela and New York City
 Caribbean Plant Protection Commission; See Regional Plant Protection Organization
 Chip PC (TASE: CPPC), a developer and manufacturer of thin client solutions and management software
 Portuguese Council for Peace and Cooperation, a member of the Secretariat of the World Peace Council

Other uses
 CPPC UAV, a Chinese UAV

See also
 Chinese People's Political Consultative Conference (CPPCC), a political advisory body in China